October 12 - Eastern Orthodox liturgical calendar - October 14

All fixed commemorations below celebrated on October 26 by Eastern Orthodox Churches on the Old Calendar.

For October 13th, Orthodox Churches on the Old Calendar commemorate the Saints listed on September 30.

Saints
 Martyr Florentius of Thessalonica (1st-2nd centuries)  (see also: March 14)
 Saint Martyrius.
 Saint Diocletian.
 Hieromartyrs Carpus, Bishop at Thyateira, and Papylus the Deacon, and Martyrs Agathadorus and Agathonica, at Pergamus (251)
 Saint Dioscorus the Martyr, by decapitation (288)
 Martyr Antigonus, by fire.
 Holy Two Children-Martyrs, by fire.
 Hieromartyr Saint Benjamin the Deacon and Martyr, of Persia (421-424) 
 Saint Nicetas the Confessor and Patrician, of Paphlagonia (c. 838)
 Saint Luke of Demena, Sicily (984)

Pre-Schism Western saints
 Saints Faustus, Januarius and Martial, martyrs in Cordoba in Spain under Diocletian, called  "The Three Crowns of Cordoba"  (304)
 Saints Fyncana and Fyndoca, two martyrs in Scotland.
 Saint Venantius, Abbot of the monastery of St. Martin in Tours, Confessor (end of 5th century)
 Saint Romulus of Genoa, Bishop of Genoa in Italy (c. 641)
 Saint Berthoald, Fifth Bishop of Cambrai-Arras in France (7th century)
 Saint Comgan, Abbot of Lochalsh (8th century)
 Saint Simpert (Simbert, Sinthert), Bishop of Augsburg in Germany (c. 809)
 Saint Gerald of Aurillac, Count of Aurillac in France, founder of a church and abbey on his estate of Aurillac (909)
 Saint Coloman of Stockerau, an Irish pilgrim en route to the Holy Land, tortured and hanged at Stockerau, near Vienna, Austria (1012)
 Saint Regimbald (Reginbald, Regimbaut), Bishop of Speyer (1039)

Post-Schism Orthodox saints
 Monk-martyr Jacob of Hamatoura Monastery, Lebanon (late 13th century)
 Venerable Benjamin of the Kiev Caves (14th century)
 Saint Meletius I Pegas, Archbishop of Alexandria (1601)  (see also: September 13)
 New martyr Chryse (Zlata) of Meglen (1795)
 Saint Anthony, Metropolitan of Chkondidi (Martvili Monastery), Georgia (1815), and his disciple James the Elder, Hieromonk.

New Martys and Confessors
 New Martyr Bosiljka Rajičić (18th century)
 New Hieromartyr Innocent Kikin. Priest (1937)
 New Hieromartyr Nicholas Yermolov, Priest (1937)

Other commemorations
 Translation to Moscow of the Iveron Icon of the Most Holy Theotokos (1648)
 Kazan Icon of the Most Holy Theotokos "Of the Seven Lakes" (17th century)
 Repose of Monk Athanasius of Valaam Monastery (1852) 
 Translation of the relics (1965) of Venerable Sabbas the Sanctified (532), from the church of Sant'Antonin, Venice, to the Holy Lavra of Saint Sabbas the Sanctified, Jerusalem.
 Uncovering of the Relics (1993) of New Hieromartyr Thaddeus (Uspensky), Archbishop of Tver (1937)

Icon gallery

Notes

References

Sources 
 October 13/26. Orthodox Calendar (PRAVOSLAVIE.RU).
 October 26 / October 13. HOLY TRINITY RUSSIAN ORTHODOX CHURCH (A parish of the Patriarchate of Moscow).
 October 13. OCA - The Lives of the Saints.
 The Autonomous Orthodox Metropolia of Western Europe and the Americas (ROCOR). St. Hilarion Calendar of Saints for the year of our Lord 2004. St. Hilarion Press (Austin, TX). p. 76.
 The Thirteenth Day of the Month of October. Orthodoxy in China.
 October 13. Latin Saints of the Orthodox Patriarchate of Rome.
 The Roman Martyrology. Transl. by the Archbishop of Baltimore. Last Edition, According to the Copy Printed at Rome in 1914. Revised Edition, with the Imprimatur of His Eminence Cardinal Gibbons. Baltimore: John Murphy Company, 1916. pp. 316–317.
 Rev. Richard Stanton. A Menology of England and Wales, or, Brief Memorials of the Ancient British and English Saints Arranged According to the Calendar, Together with the Martyrs of the 16th and 17th Centuries. London: Burns & Oates, 1892. p. 492.
Greek Sources
 Great Synaxaristes:  13 ΟΚΤΩΒΡΙΟΥ. ΜΕΓΑΣ ΣΥΝΑΞΑΡΙΣΤΗΣ.
  Συναξαριστής. 13 Οκτωβρίου. ECCLESIA.GR. (H ΕΚΚΛΗΣΙΑ ΤΗΣ ΕΛΛΑΔΟΣ).
  13/10/2017. Ορθόδοξος Συναξαριστής. 
Russian Sources
  26 октября (13 октября). Православная Энциклопедия под редакцией Патриарха Московского и всея Руси Кирилла (электронная версия). (Orthodox Encyclopedia - Pravenc.ru).
  13 октября по старому стилю / 26 октября по новому стилю. Русская Православная Церковь - Православный церковный календарь на 2016 год.

October in the Eastern Orthodox calendar